Bazaar Band Karo is a 1974 Bollywood film directed by B. R. Ishara and starring Asha Chandra and Manher Desai.

Reception
Film World described the film as making "no impact on the public".

Music

References

External links
 

1974 films
1970s Hindi-language films
Films scored by Bappi Lahiri
Films directed by B. R. Ishara